Jamini Bhushan Ray (1 July 1879 – 11 August 1926) was an Indian physician, as well as an Ayurvedic doctor (Kabiraj), an erudite Sanskrit scholar, and a philanthropist.

Biography

Early life

Born in 1879 to Kaviraj Panchanan Ray (Kavichintamoni) in Poyogram village in the Khulna District of India (now in Bangladesh), he initially attended the local village school. At an early age he was sent to nearby Calcutta (then the capital of British India) and graduated high school at the age of 14 from South Suburban School in the Bhowanipore neighbourhood of South Calcutta.

Education

After high school, Kaviraj Jamini Bhushan Ray enrolled himself for his Bachelor of Arts studies at Government Sanskrit College, Calcutta. Upon completion of his bachelor's degree, he simultaneously started pursuing his Master of Arts studies at Government Sanskrit College, and worked towards getting his medical degree at Calcutta Medical College. All along this time, at home he was taking lessons on Ayurveda – the ancient Indian medical science – from his father – a renowned practitioner in his own right.

While still studying medicine he earned his master's degree in Arts (M.A.) majoring in the ancient Indian language of Sanskrit. Then in 1905, when he completed his Bachelor of Medicine (M.B.) and also M.R.A.S., he stood first in his class and was awarded a Gold Medal; the accompanying citation mentioned his high proficiency in "Gynaecology and Midwifery". It was then that he decided that he would not pursue a career in western medicine – instead, like his father before him he would be a Kaviraj, or an Indian Ayurvedic doctor. That's when he started formally taking lessons on Ayurveda from Kaviraj Mahamahopadhyay Bijoy Ratna Sen, the leading Ayurvedic physician of that era. Subsequently, he embarked on his illustrious career when Bagala Marwari Hospital hired him as a Kaviraj for a monthly salary of Rupees Forty – a princely sum in those days.

Medical practice
He is a physician
In 1906,Jamini Bhushan Ray started practising the ancient Indian system of Ayurveda – despite being educated in the western system of medicine. In those days the practise of Ayurveda was not glamorous, considered ancient, and way past its prime. His friends and well wishers tried to dissuade him from his chosen path, instead advising him to practice western medicine – in which he was already well-versed. But he refused, saying: “If I cannot make a living practising Ayurveda, then I shall make a living by selling Panchan (Ayurvedic laxative).”

With a view to reviving the glory of Ayurveda, lost over the ages mainly due to India's rule by foreign powers and their lack of support for ancient Indian traditions, Dr. Ray set up the Vaidyaraj Pharmacy that sold only Ayurvedic medicines. He and his staff at the pharmacy made pioneering attempts to standardise Ayurvedic medicine in accordance with modern scientific methods. His fame soon spread far and wide. To raise awareness and fund his research – he increased his fees from Rupees 4 to Rupees 32, while treatment of poor people who couldn't afford his fees was always free. Out of town trips to visit wealthy patients cost them Rupees 1,000 – which they gladly paid. His patients included the Maharajas of Gwalior, Indore and Tipperah.

By 1915 he was sort of a celebrity in the field of Ayurvedic medicine, and that year was elected President of the 7th All India Ayurvedic Conference in Madras. During that visit to the Southern city, he was highly impressed with the functioning of and the amenities at Madras Ayurvedic College and decided he would establish a similar institution in his native Calcutta. 

In 1916, at a rented house on 29 Fariapukur Street, he set up the Ashtanga Ayurveda College and Hospital. Dr Ray's practical idealism for amalgamating the ancient with the modern soon caught the attention of Mahatma Gandhi; and 9 years later, on 6 May 1925, it was Gandhi who laid the foundation stone for the institute's new building on Raja Dinendra Street – where the J B Roy State Ayurvedic Medical College and Hospital still stands. In 2016 the college celebrated its centenary.

Philanthropy

Aside from contributing Rupees 70,000 of his own money for the construction of the new buildings, in his last will Kaviraj Jamini Bhushan Ray bequeathed to his institution large portions of immovable property that he owned at various place in India.

These include:
 13 Cottahs (9,360 square feet) of land in upscale Ballygunge neighbourhood of Calcutta.
 6 Cottahs (4,320 square feet) of land on Grey Street (in the Central business district), Calcutta.
 12 Bighas (172,800 square feet) of land including his garden house at Patipukur
 The Patipukur TB Hospital is currently located on this landed property
 His estate in Kurseong, a hill station nestled in the Himalayas near Darjeeling.
 His estate in Ranchi, capital of Jharkhand, India.

Books
(Though titled in English – all books were originally written in Sanskrit)

 Diseases – Their Origin and Diagnosis.
 A Treatise on Diseases of Ear, Nose, Throat and Mouth.
 The care of infants and the diseases of children.
 A Manual of Toxicology.

These books are based on ancient Indian "Salakya Tantra" (Otolaryngology, or Ear, Nose, Throat), "Prashuti Tantra" (Gynecology), "Bisha Tantra" (Toxicology) and "Kumara Tantra" (Pediatrics). Particularly his book "Diseases – Their Origin and Diagnosis" brought him wide reputation and critical acclaim. He published a monthly journal in Bengali called "Ayurveda".

Personal life
Kaviraj Jamini Bhushan Ray was married to Saroj Bala Devi, and had 6 children. Like their father, his sons Bijoy Bhushan, Hari Bhushan and Kali Bhushan were brilliant students. However the 2 younger sons prematurely died in their late teens.

Death and legacy
Jamini Bhushan Ray suddenly died in Calcutta on 11 August 1926 – just a day after he donated 200,000 Rupees to his beloved Ashtanga Ayurveda Vidyalaya. He was just 47 years old. In his honour a road in Calcutta, not far from Ashtanga Ayurveda Hospital, has been named Jamini Kaviraj Row. 7 years after his death – in his garden house at Patipukur, was established Patipukur TB Hospital. Dr. Bidhan Chandra Roy, eminent physician, freedom fighter and later Chief Minister of West Bengal, laid the foundation stone.

References

 Samsad Bangali Charitabhadhan (Who's who) Part 1 – Revised 3rd Edition.
 Published by Shishu Sahitya Samsad – 32A, Acharya Prafulla Chandra Road, Kolkata 700009.
 A Short Report on the Growth & Development of Jamini Bhushan Ashtanga Ayurveda Vidyalaya & Ayurveda Aragyashala (7 January 1953)
 An Advanced History of India – Ramesh Chandra Majumdar, H. C. Raychaudhuri & Kalikinkar Datta.
 Report on the proceedings of 7th All India Ayurvedic Conference, Madras (Chennai), December 1915.
 Ayurveda Prachar – Part 1 – October 1930 (Bengali calendar: Kartick 1337)
 Ayurveda Prachar – Part 2 – May 1931 (Bengali calendar: Joishtho 1338)
 Ayurveda Mahamandal Ka Rajat Jayanti Grantha (Part 1)
 Department of Health & Family Welfare – Government of West Bengal
 History of Medicine in India: the Medical Encounter – Chittabrata Palit & Achintya Kumar Dutta – Page 228

External links
 http://www.jbroyayurvedacentenary.org 
 http://www.gandhi-manibhavan.org/gandhiphilosophy/philosophy_environment_naturecure.htm 
 Chronology of Mahatma Gandhi's life
 gandhiserve.org, pages 280 through 283
 http://www.mkgandhi.org/articles/views_on_sci.htm
 gandhiserve.org page 254

1879 births
1926 deaths
Medical doctors from Kolkata
Ayurvedacharyas
Indian philanthropists
Sanskrit scholars from Bengal
The Sanskrit College and University alumni
University of Calcutta alumni
Founders of Indian schools and colleges
20th-century Indian medical doctors
Bengali scientists
19th-century Indian medical doctors